"Made in Heaven" is the third single recorded by Freddie Mercury, and his fourth release as a solo artist. Originally featured in Mercury's debut album, the song was slightly modified and published as a 45rpm paired with "She Blows Hot and Cold", described on the record sleeve as 'A Brand New Track'. The single reached #57 on the UK Singles Chart.

After Mercury's death, the song's title gave the name to Queen's 1995 posthumous album Made in Heaven. The song was also chosen, along with "I Was Born to Love You", to be re-recorded for the album, with the previous vocals over a newly recorded instrumental track.

Personnel

Original version
Freddie Mercury - lead vocals, piano, synthesiser
Fred Mandel - piano, synthesiser, guitar
Paul Vincent - lead guitar
Curt Cress - drums
Stephan Wissnet - bass guitar, Fairlight CMI
Reinhold Mack - Fairlight CMI
Queen version
Freddie Mercury - lead vocals, piano, keyboards
Brian May - electric guitar, slide guitar
Roger Taylor - drums, percussion
John Deacon - bass guitar

Releases and track listing
The single was released in 7" and 12" format.

7" single release

The 7" single was also released as a shaped picture disc.

12" single release

Music video
The song's video was directed by David Mallet, previously involved in the making of the music video for "I Was Born to Love You", as well as five Queen clips. A Royal Opera House replica was built inside a warehouse in North London (as normal studios did not have high enough roofs), where Mercury wanted to recreate scenes from Stravinskij's The Rite of Spring and Dante's Inferno. The most remarkable element is probably the 67-foot tall rotating globe on top of which the singer stands in the last part of the video clip. The outfit that Mercury wears in this music video is quite similar to the outfit worn in the music video for the Queen single "Radio Ga Ga". Mallet and Mercury used the 1952 film The Importance  of Being Earnest as inspiration for the set.

Charts

See also
Mr. Bad Guy
Made in Heaven

Notes

References

External links

1985 songs
1985 singles
Freddie Mercury songs
Queen (band) songs
Songs written by Freddie Mercury
Song recordings produced by Reinhold Mack
Columbia Records singles
Music videos directed by David Mallet (director)